Mahendraganj Legislative Assembly constituency is one of the 60 Legislative Assembly constituencies of Meghalaya state in India.

It is part of South West Garo Hills district and it shares its international border with Bangladesh.

Members of the Legislative Assembly

Election results

2018

See also
 List of constituencies of the Meghalaya Legislative Assembly
 West Garo Hills district

References

West Garo Hills district
Assembly constituencies of Meghalaya